Norma Rae is a 1979 American drama film directed by Martin Ritt from a screenplay written by Irving Ravetch and Harriet Frank Jr. The film is based on the true story of Crystal Lee Sutton – which was told in the 1975 book Crystal Lee, a Woman of Inheritance by reporter Henry P. Leifermann of The New York Times –  and stars Sally Field in the titular role. Beau Bridges, Ron Leibman, Pat Hingle, Barbara Baxley, and Gail Strickland are featured in supporting roles. The film follows Norma Rae Webster, a factory worker with little formal education in North Carolina who becomes involved in trade union activities at the textile factory where she works after her and her co-workers' health is compromised due to poor working conditions.

Norma Rae premiered at the 1979 Cannes Film Festival where it competed for the Palme d'Or, while Field won the Best Actress Prize. It was theatrically released on March 2, 1979, by 20th Century Fox to critical and commercial success. Reviewers praised the film's direction, screenplay, message and especially Field's performance, while the film grossed $22 million on a production budget of $4.5 million. The film received four nominations at the 52nd Academy Awards including Best Picture and won two; Best Actress (for Field) and Best Original Song for its theme song "It Goes Like It Goes". The film is considered "culturally, historically or aesthetically" significant by the U.S. Library of Congress and was selected to be preserved in the National Film Registry in 2011.

Plot 
Norma Rae Wilson is a worker in a cotton mill that has taken too much of a toll on the health of her family for her to ignore their poor working conditions. She is also a single mother with two children by different fathers, one dead and the other negligent, and frequently has flings with other men to alleviate her loneliness and boredom. Initially, management tries to divert her frequent protests by promoting her to "spot checker", where she is responsible for making sure other workers are fulfilling work quotas. She reluctantly takes the job for the pay hike, but when fellow employees, including her own father, shun her for effectively being a "fink" to the bosses, she demands to be fired. Instead, she is demoted back to the line.

Two men enter her life that change her perspective. A former co-worker, Sonny Webster, asks her out after earlier causing trouble for her at the mill. Divorced with a daughter, he proposes marriage after a short courtship; recognizing how long it has been since she met a non-selfish man to keep company with, she accepts his offer. After a few charged encounters with Reuben Warshowsky, a union organizer from New York City, Norma Rae listens to him deliver a speech that spurs her to join the effort to unionize her shop. This causes conflict at home when Sonny observes she's not spending enough time in the home and is frequently exhausted when she is present. When her father drops dead at the mill of a heart attack—a death that could have been averted had he been allowed to leave his post early instead of waiting for his allotted break—she is more determined to continue the fight.

Management retaliates against the organization efforts, first by rearranging shifts so that workers are doing more work at less pay, and then by posting fliers with racial invective in the hope of dividing white and black workers and diluting the momentum. Warshowsky demands Norma copy down the racist flier word for word in order to use it as evidence for government sanctions against her mill. When she attempts to transcribe the flier, management attempts to stop her, then fire her on grounds of creating a disturbance, and call the police to remove her from the plant. While awaiting the sheriff, Norma Rae takes a piece of cardboard, writes the word "UNION" on it, stands on her work table, and slowly turns to show the sign around the room.  One by one, the other workers stop their mill machines, and eventually, the entire room becomes silent. After all the machines have been switched off, Norma Rae is taken to jail but is freed by Reuben.

Upon returning home to her family, Norma decides to talk to her children and tell them the story of her life, their questionable parentage, and recent arrest, so that they are prepared for any smears that may come from those hoping to discredit her efforts. After a tense exchange with Reuben, Sonny asks her if they have been intimate; she says no, but acknowledges "he's in my head." Sonny, in turn, tells her there's no other woman in his head and he will always remain with her.

An election to unionize the factory takes place, with Norma and Reuben listening as best as possible from outside the mill as reporters and TV cameras observe the vote count. With a difference shy of 100 votes, the result is a victory for the union. Shortly after, Reuben says goodbye to Norma; despite his being smitten with her, they shake hands because he knows she is married and loves her husband, and Reuben heads back to New York.

Cast

Production 
Norma Rae was filmed on location in Opelika, Alabama. The mill scenes were shot at the Opelika Manufacturing Corp., and the motel scenes were filmed at The Golden Cherry Motel.

Inspiration 
The movie's plot is based on events from the life of textile worker and union organiser Crystal Lee Sutton, who fought the J.P. Stevens Textiles mill in her hometown Roanoke Rapids, North Carolina. The scene where Norma Rae writes "UNION" on a sheet of cardboard and stands on a table until her co-workers shut off their machines is closely based on a protest by Lee Sutton in 1978. Although Lee Sutton was fired from her job, the mill was unionized and she went to work as an organizer for the textile union. In 2003 the Stevens textile mill closed, along with hundreds of other similar factories across the Carolinas, as US textile manufacturing moved offshore to countries like China and Mexico.

Reception

Norma Rae received widely positive reviews at the time of its release. On Rotten Tomatoes it has a "Certified Fresh" approval rating of 90% based on 31 reviews, with an average rating of 7.6/10. The website's critical consensus reads: "Spearheaded by a galvanizing Sally Field, Norma Rae is a heartening and politically powerful drama about an ordinary woman taking an extraordinary stand." On Metacritic, the film has a weighted average score of 61 out of 100, based on reviews from 47 critics, indicating "generally favorable reviews".

Vincent Canby of The New York Times raved about Field's performance, declaring that "we are witnessing one of those unusual motion picture performances that seems to be in the process of taking off as we watch it ... Her triumph in Norma Rae is to have shucked off at long last all need to associate her with her TV beginnings, not because they are vulgar but because the performance she gives here is as big as the screen that presents it." Variety wrote, "'Norma Rae' is a superb film. Paced by Sally Field's best performance to date in a rapidly accelerating career, and under Martin Ritt's firm but sensitive direction, the 20th Century-Fox release is that rare entity, an intelligent film with heart." Gene Siskel of the Chicago Tribune gave the film 2.5 stars out of 4 and praised Field for a "thoroughly winning performance," but thought that Leibman gave a "lousy, overbearing performance that, for me, wrecked the movie." Charles Champlin of the Los Angeles Times called the film "a wonderful and—for want of a better word—judicious work." Penelope Gilliatt of The New Yorker wrote "This picture is historically fascinating in what it tells us of the labor movement, and it does honor to a particular sort of involved character who will not be intimidated. Well done." Gary Arnold of The Washington Post stated that "Sally Field embodies the title character with considerable sincerity," but "the movie comes so unraveled that in retrospect the images of loose strands of fiber in the air seem more significant than the character of the heroine or the bleak factory environment. The screenplay by Irving Ravetch and Harriet Frank Jr. ... turns out to be a pile of loose thematic and emotional strands." Tom Milne of The Monthly Film Bulletin wrote "Heart-warming is probably the word for Norma Rae, a film which leaves no cliché unturned in its cosy efforts to demonstrate how a woman no better than she ought to be becomes better than most of us."

The New York Times placed the film on its Best 1000 Movies Ever list.

Awards and nominations 

In 2011, Norma Rae was selected for the United States National Film Registry by the Library of Congress as being "culturally, historically, or aesthetically significant".

The film is recognized by American Film Institute in these lists:
 2003: AFI's 100 Years...100 Heroes & Villains:
 Norma Rae Webster – #15 Hero
 2004: AFI's 100 Years...100 Songs:
 "It Goes Like It Goes" – Nominated
 2006: AFI's 100 Years...100 Cheers – #16

Home media
Norma Rae was released on VHS in December 1996, on DVD in December 2006, and Blu-ray in April 2014.

Musical adaptation
In December 2017, it was announced that Norma Rae was to be adapted into a stage musical. Rosanne Cash was set to compose the score.

References

External links 
 Norma Rae essay by Gabriel Miller on the National Film Registry website 
 
 
 
 
 North Carolina News Network news story, Inspiration for Norma Rae Dies

1979 films
1979 drama films
1970s English-language films
1970s feminist films
1970s political drama films
20th Century Fox films
American political drama films
Cotton industry in the United States
Films about activists
Films about the labor movement
Films about the working class
Films directed by Martin Ritt
Films scored by David Shire
Films featuring a Best Actress Academy Award-winning performance
Films featuring a Best Drama Actress Golden Globe-winning performance
Films set in 1978
Films set in factories
Films set in North Carolina
Films shot in Alabama
Films that won the Best Original Song Academy Award
United States National Film Registry films
UNITE HERE
1970s American films